Alucita megaphimus is a species of moth of the family Alucitidae. It is known from Cameroon.

References

Endemic fauna of Cameroon
Alucitidae
Moths described in 1917
Insects of Cameroon
Moths of Africa